Fominsky is a rural locality (a settlement) in Konoshsky District, Arkhangelsk Oblast, Russia. The population was 62 as of 2012. There are 3 streets.

Geography 
Fominsky is located 40 km north of Konosha (the district's administrative centre) by road. Ostashevskaya is the nearest rural locality.

References 

Rural localities in Konoshsky District